Yaossédougou is a town in northeast Ivory Coast. It is a sub-prefecture of Dabakala Department in Hambol Region, Vallée du Bandama District.

Yaossédougou was a commune until March 2012, when it became one of 1126 communes nationwide that were abolished.

In 2014, the population of the sub-prefecture of Tendéné-Bambarasso was 8,769 8,769.

Villages
The 13 villages of the sub-prefecture of Tendéné-Bambarasso and their population in 2014 are
 Bangolo (900)
 Bidiala-Sobara (725)
 Bobosso (841)
 Goumbodougou (568)
 Kaniéguéma (706)
 Kossaba (311)
 Nakala (511)
 Sorolo (742)
 Tédiala-Bambarasso (591)
 Tédiala-Noumousso (184)
 Tendéné-Bambarasso (1 363)
 Toupé (184)
 Wendèné (1 143)

Notes

Sub-prefectures of Hambol
Former communes of Ivory Coast